James Vincent McGarr (November 9, 1888 – July 21, 1981), nicknamed "Reds" was a Major League Baseball replacement player on May 18, 1912 when the Detroit Tigers went on strike to protest the suspension of Ty Cobb. Born in Philadelphia, McGarr played second base for the Tigers during the one-game strike, going went hitless in four at-bats. In the field, he recorded one putout, three assists, and one error. McGarr and fellow replacement player Dan McGarvey were friends who had also been teammates at Georgetown College.  Other replacement players that day included Allan Travers, Hap Ward, Billy Maharg, Bill Leinhauser, Vincent Maney, and Jack Smith.

McGarr was the last of the "strikebreakers" to die, in Miami, Florida at age 92 in 1981; ironically, when McGarr died, the major leagues were on strike.

External links

 SABR Biography of Replacement Player
 The Suspension Game

Detroit Tigers players
Major League Baseball second basemen
Baseball players from Philadelphia
1888 births
1981 deaths